Sonnenberg may refer to:

Places
 Sonnenberg, a municipality in the Oberhavel district, in Brandenburg, Germany.
 Sonnenberg-Winnenberg, a municipality in the district of Birkenfeld, in Rhineland-Palatinate, Germany
 Wiesbaden-Sonnenberg, a borough of Wiesbaden, the capital of the state of Hesse, Germany
 Sonnenberg (Winterthur), a quarter in the district 3 of Winterthur, Switzerland
 Sonnenberg (Harz), a ski resort in the Upper Harz in Lower Saxony, Germany
 Výsluní (Sonnenberg), a town in Chomutov District, Czech Republic
 The Sonnenberg Tunnel, a motorway tunnel near Lucerne, Switzerland
 Sonnenberg Gardens and Mansion State Historic Park, in Canandaigua, New York

Mountains and hills 
 Sonnenberg (Kriens), hill near the city of Lucerne in Switzerland
 Sonnenberg (Leitha), highest peak in the Leitha Mountains, Burgenland, Austria
 Sonnenberg (Eifel), hill in the Eifel mountains of Germany
 Sonnenberg, also called the Sonnenspitze, a mountain in the Ammergau Alps of Bavaria, Germany

People with the surname
 Ben Sonnenberg (1936-2010), publisher of Grand Street magazine
 Gus Sonnenberg, an American football player, wrestler, and a World War I veteran
 Jerry Sonnenberg, a legislator in the U.S. state of Colorado
 Martin Sonnenberg, a Canadian professional ice hockey player
 Max Liebermann von Sonnenberg (1848-1911), a German officer who became noted as an anti-Semitic politician
 Nadja Salerno-Sonnenberg, an Italian-American classical violinist